Hall County is a county located in the U.S. state of Texas.  As of the 2020 census, the population is 2,825. Its county seat is Memphis. The county was created in 1876 and later organized in 1890. It is named for Warren D. C. Hall, a secretary of war for the Republic of Texas.

Geography

Major highways
  U.S. Highway 287
  State Highway 70
  State Highway 86
  State Highway 256

Adjacent counties
 Donley County (north)
 Collingsworth County (northeast)
 Childress County (east)
 Cottle County (southeast)
 Motley County (south)
 Briscoe County (west)

Demographics

Note: the US Census treats Hispanic/Latino as an ethnic category. This table excludes Latinos from the racial categories and assigns them to a separate category. Hispanics/Latinos can be of any race.

As of the census of 2000,  3,782 people, 1,548 households, and 1,013 families resided in the county.  The population density was 4 people per square mile (2/km2).  The 1,988 housing units averaged 2 per square mile (1/km2).  The racial makeup of the county was 71.97% White, 8.22% Black or African American, 0.53% Native American, 0.16% Asian, 17.90% from other races, and 1.22% from two or more races.  About 27.50% of the population was Hispanic or Latino of any race.

Of the 1,548 households, 28.20% had children under the age of 18 living with them, 53.70% were married couples living together, 9.00% had a female householder with no husband present, and 34.50% were not families; 32.40% of all households were made up of individuals, and 19.60% had someone living alone who was 65 years of age or older.  The average household size was 2.42 and the average family size was 3.06.

In the county, the population was distributed as 27.20% under the age of 18, 6.80% from 18 to 24, 22.10% from 25 to 44, 22.40% from 45 to 64, and 21.50% who were 65 years of age or older.  The median age was 40 years. For every 100 females, there were 91.70 males.  For every 100 females age 18 and over, there were 86.50 males.

The median income for a household in the county was $23,016, and for a family was $27,325. Males had a median income of $22,167 versus $19,050 for females. The per capita income for the county was $13,210.  About 21.60% of families and 26.30% of the population were below the poverty line, including 39.80% of those under age 18 and 16.30% of those age 65 or over.

Education
Hall County is served by these districts:
 Memphis Independent School District
 Turkey-Quitaque Independent School District
 Childress Independent School District (partial)

Communities

Cities
 Memphis (county seat)
 Turkey

Towns
 Estelline
 Lakeview
 Brice

Former Towns
 Plaska

Notable people
 William Mac Thornberry, U.S. Representative
 Daniel I.J. Thornton, governor of Colorado
 Blues Boy Willie, blues musician
 Bob Wills, musician

At one time, the JA Ranch, founded by Charles Goodnight and John George Adair, which reached into six counties, held acreage in Hall County. Minnie Lou Bradley, matriarch of the Bradley 3 Ranch in nearby Childress County, claims a Hall County address.

Politics

Republican Drew Springer, Jr., a businessman from Muenster in Cooke County, has since January 2013 represented Hall County in the Texas House of Representatives. He succeeded Rick Hardcastle of Vernon, who retired after 14 years in the position.

See also

 List of museums in the Texas Panhandle
 National Register of Historic Places listings in Hall County, Texas
 Recorded Texas Historic Landmarks in Hall County

References

External links
 Hall County Memories
 
 Hall County Profile from the Texas Association of Counties
 Historic Hall County materials, hosted by the Portal to Texas History.

 
1890 establishments in Texas
Populated places established in 1890
Texas Panhandle